Antin Anhelovych (14 April 1756 – 9 August 1814) was the first Metropolitan Archbishop of the re-built Metropolitan of Lviv from 1808 until his death in 1814.

Life
Antin Anhelovych was born on 14 April 1756 in Hryniv, near Bibrka, now in Ukraine. He studied at the Barbareum (a Greek Catholic college in Vienna) and in 1793 he became the first rector of the Greek Catholic Theological Seminary in Lviv. In 1794 he became professor of dogma and in 1796 rector of University of Lviv.

In 1795 he was appointed eparch of Eparchy of Przemyśl and so consecrated a bishop on 14 February 1796. by Bishop Porfyriy Skarbek-Vazhynskyi of Chełm. In 1798 he was appointed administrator of the Lviv eparchy, in 1804 administrator of the Chełm eparchy, and in 1805 administrator of both the Lviv and Kholm eparchies. 

By 1805, the "Metropolis of Kiev, Galicia and all Ruthenia" was effectively dissolved. In its place, Emperor Francis I of Austria decided to re-establish a Galician metropolis in the western part of the Kingdom of Galicia and Lodomeria on 11 September 1806. In this way these territories were split from the jurisdiction of the main Metropolis of Kyiv of Ukrainian Greek Catholic Church, which was suffering under the Russian Empire (actually in 1839 the Greek-Catholic church was dissolved in the Russian Empire, and all its property was transferred to the Orthodox state church).

Pope Pius VII approved this split on 24 February 1807 elevating the Eparchy of Lviv to the rank of Metropolis and granting it the same rights of the Metropolis of Kyiv. On 16 March 1808 Angelovych was appointed the first Greek-Catholic Metropolitan in Lviv. The enthronement occurred on 25 September 1808. Antin Anhelovych died in Lviv on 9 August 1814.

Notes

1756 births
1814 deaths
People from Lviv Oblast
People from Ruthenian Voivodeship
Ukrainian Eastern Catholics
Polish Eastern Catholics
18th-century Eastern Catholic bishops
19th-century Eastern Catholic archbishops
University of Lviv rectors
Deaths from streptococcus infection
Bishops of Przemyśl
Metropolitans of Galicia (1808-2005)